The 84th 2007 Lithuanian Athletics Championships were held in S. Darius and S. Girėnas Stadium, Kaunas on 28–29 July 2007.

Men

Women

References 
Results

External links 
 Lithuanian athletics (old)
 Lithuanian athletics (new)

Lithuanian Athletics Championships
Lithuanian Athletics Championships, 2007
Lithuanian Athletics Championships